Uplands is a neighbourhood in the City of London, Ontario, Canada. The neighbourhood is located in the northern part of the city. Almost all of its residents live in low-density, single detached dwellings. As of 2011, the area is home to 7,835 residents.

The neighbourhood is considered a middle to upper-income area, with an average family income of $128,806 an average dwelling value of $371,210 and a home ownership rate of 85%.

Government and politics
Uplands exists within the federal electoral district of London North Centre.  It is currently represented by Peter Fragiskatos of the Liberal Party, first elected in 2015.

Provincially, the area is within the constituency of London North Centre.  It is currently represented by Terence Kernaghan of the New Democratic Party, first elected in 2018 and re-elected in 2022.

In London's non-partisan municipal politics, Uplands lies within ward 5.  It is currently represented by Councillor Jerry Pribil, first elected in 2022.

Institutions

Education

 Jack Chambers Public School - public elementary school, part of the Thames Valley District School Board.

Commercial
Within Uplands itself, the primary commercial development is at or adjacent to the Masonville Place shopping mall, which was built in the 1985 at the southeast corner of Fanshawe Park Road and Richmond Street. A second smaller commercial development, the Stoneybrook Shopping Plaza, is located at the northwest corner of Fanshawe Park Road and Adelaide Street.

Location
The neighbourhood is bordered by Fanshawe Park Road East to the south, Adelaide Street North to the east, Sunningdale Road East to the north, and Richmond Street to the west. It is bordered by the residential neighbourhoods of Masonville, Sunningdale, Stoney Creek and Stoneybrook.

References

Neighbourhoods in London, Ontario